Roberto Longo (born 9 May 1953) is an Italian mathematician, specializing in operator algebras and quantum field theory.

Education and career 
Roberto Longo graduated in Mathematics at the Sapienza University of Rome in 1975 under the supervision of the mathematical physicist Sergio Doplicher. From 1975 to 1977 Longo was a predoctoral fellow of the Consiglio Nazionale delle Ricerche and later assistant professor at the Sapienza University of Rome, where he became an associate professor in 1980. In 1987 he was nominated full professor of functional analysis at the University of Rome Tor Vergata and since 2010 he is the director of the Center for Mathematics and Theoretical Physics in Rome.

Between 1978 and 1979 he was visiting scholar at the University of Pennsylvania and the University of California, Berkeley. He has been a visiting professor in numerous research centers, including the CNRS in Marseille, the Mathematical Sciences Research Institute in Berkeley, California, the Harvard University, MIT, and the University of Göttingen.

Longo is an expert in the theory of operator algebras and its applications to quantum field theory. His work influenced the structural analysis of quantum field theory, especially of conformal field theory, and opened up to new developments in model building methods of interest in local quantum physics.

Roberto Longo is known in particular for his work with Sergio Doplicher on split inclusions of von Neumann algebras and for having solved, independently with Sorin Popa, the Stone-Weierstrass conjecture for factorial states. He also found the relationship between the statistical dimension and the Jones index. In a work with Yasuyuki Kawahigashi, Longo classified the discrete series of conformal chiral networks of von Neumann algebras. Together with Vincenzo Morinelli and Karl-Henning Rehren, he also showed that particles with infinite spin cannot appear in a local theory. His most recent works concern entropy and information for infinite quantum systems.

Honors and awards 
In 1994 Longo was an invited speaker at the International Congress of Mathematicians in Zurich. He was invited speaker at the International Congress on Mathematical Physics in 1981 in Berlin, in 1988 in Swansea, in 1994 in Paris, and in 2003 in Lisbon. In 2004 he was Andrejewski Lecturer in Göttingen. He was a plenary speaker at the International Congress of Mathematicians in 2009 in Prague and at Strings 2018 in Okinawa.

In 2013 he was elected a Fellow of the American Mathematical Society and in 2021 a member of the Academia Europaea. He was awarded in 2016 the Humboldt Research Award 
and in 2021 the XL medal from the Accademia Nazionale delle Scienze detta dei XL for his in-depth and innovative research in operator algebras and in conformal field theory. In 2013 the conference Mathematics and Quantum Physics at the Lincei National Academy was dedicated to him on the occasion of his 60th birthday. In 2008 and in 2015 he received two Advanced Grants from the European Research Council. In 2018 he was member of the sectional panel Mathematical Physics of the International Congress of Mathematicians in Rio de Janeiro.

Selected publications

See also 

 Axiomatic quantum field theory
 Local quantum physics
 Operator algebra
 Quantum field theory

References

External links 

 .
 .
 
 
 
 
 
 
 

1953 births
Living people
Sapienza University of Rome alumni
Academic staff of the Sapienza University of Rome
Academic staff of the University of Rome Tor Vergata
Mathematical physicists
20th-century Italian physicists
21st-century Italian physicists
20th-century Italian mathematicians
21st-century Italian mathematicians
Fellows of the American Mathematical Society
Members of Academia Europaea
Humboldt Research Award recipients